Jeremy G. S. Robinson (born 21 January 1966) is an English professional golfer.

Robinson was born in Scarborough and learnt the game as a junior member at Woodhall Spa Golf Club in Lincolnshire, where his father and brother were also members at the time. He was a talented junior golfer and won the Peter McEvoy Trophy in 1982. Robinson studied Economics at Florida State University in the United States, where he was twice named Most Outstanding Athlete in the Metro Conference. In 1987 he won the Brabazon Trophy, Berkshire Trophy and Philip Scrutton Jug before turning professional later that year having represented Great Britain and Ireland in the Walker Cup (with a 2–2–0 record). Robinson is one of the few amateur golfers to have won both The Berkshire and Brabazon Trophies in the same calendar year, the others being Philip Scrutton (1952), Guy Wolstenholme (1960), Michael Bonallack (1968, 1971), Peter Hedges (1976) and Sandy Lyle (1977).

Robinson played on the European Tour and the developmental Challenge Tour between 1988 and 2002. He played in over 250 European Tour events. He had most success on the Challenge Tour where he won five tournaments. In 2009, he represented Great Britain and Ireland in the 2009 PGA Cup. Since leaving the tour he has worked as a teaching professional, and is also a partner in Sports Masters International.

Robinson is now a Director of BlackStar Golf and a member of European Senior Tour. His eldest son Ben Robinson is now a professional golfer having graduated from Louisiana Tech University.

Amateur wins
1982 Peter McEvoy Trophy
1985 Lagonda Trophy, Lincolnshire Amateur Championship
1986 North of England Open Amateur Youth Championship 
1987 Brabazon Trophy, Berkshire Trophy, Scrutton Jug

Professional wins (5)

Challenge Tour wins (5)
1989 Air France Trophy, Old Links Satellite
1991 Kenya Open
1992 Zambia Open, Open Dijon Bourgogne

Results in major championships

Robinson only played in The Open Championship.

CUT = missed the half-way cut
"T" = tied

Team appearances
Amateur
Jacques Léglise Trophy (representing Great Britain & Ireland): 1983 (winners)
European Amateur Team Championship (representing England): 1987
Walker Cup (representing Great Britain & Ireland): 1987
England at Under 18, Under 21 and Men's Team

Professional
PGA Cup (representing Great Britain & Ireland): 2009

See also
List of golfers with most Challenge Tour wins

References

External links

English male golfers
Florida State Seminoles men's golfers
European Tour golfers
Sportspeople from Scarborough, North Yorkshire
People from Evesham
Sportspeople from Worcestershire
1966 births
Living people